Guanadrel is an antihypertensive agent. It is used in the form of its sulfate.

Mechanism of action
Guanadrel is a postganglionic adrenergic blocking agent. Uptake of guanadrel and storage in sympathetic neurons occurs via the norepinephrine pump; guanadrel slowly displaces norepinephrine from its storage in nerve endings and thereby blocks the release of norepinephrine normally produced by nerve stimulation. The reduction in neurotransmitter release in response to sympathetic nerve stimulation, as a result of catecholamine depletion, leads to reduced arteriolar vasoconstriction, especially the reflex increase in sympathetic tone that occurs with a change in position.  Guanadrel is rapidly and well absorbed from gastrointestinal tract.

In 1981 the JAMA reported guanadrel as an effective step II or step III treatment of hypertension.

References

External links
 webpage on guanadrel, from Mayo Clinic

Adrenergic release inhibitors
Antihypertensive agents
Guanidines
Ketals
Spiro compounds